Barry Andrews (born 1944) is a British actor best known for his work in horror films such as Dracula Has Risen from the Grave (1968) and The Blood on Satan's Claw (1970).

He also played the lead role of Jon Pigeon in the sex comedy I'm Not Feeling Myself Tonight (1975). Andrews also appeared in the 1979 Doctor Who serial, Nightmare of Eden as a secret agent.

His other films have included small roles in movies such as Revenge (1971), Rentadick (1972), The Spy Who Loved Me (1977), and North Sea Hijack (1979).

Personal life 

In 1993, his son, Eyjolfur (then 17) was sentenced to life imprisonment for shooting and murdering a legal clerk with a sawn-off shotgun during a robbery at a newsagent's when he handed over 26p. However, in 2001, his sentence was reduced due to forgiveness from the victim's family and good progress he'd made in prison, making him eligible for parole the following year.

Filmography
Dracula Has Risen from the Grave (1968) - Paul
Revenge (1971) - Sergeant
The Blood on Satan's Claw (1971) - Ralph Gower
Rentadick (1972) - Policeman
 I'm Not Feeling Myself Tonight (1976) - Jon Pigeon
The Spy Who Loved Me  (1977) - Lieutenant, AWEO (Asst. Weapon Engineering Officer) (HMS Ranger Crewman)
North Sea Hijack (1979) - Truck Driver (uncredited)

References

External links

Barry Andrews at Theatricalia

British male actors
1944 births
Living people